Roped by Radio is a 1925 American silent film directed by Denver Dixon, and starring Art Mix, Dorothy Lee and Wilbur McGaugh. It premiered on April 22, 1925, in Galveston, Texas.

Cast
Art Mix (billed as George Kesterson) as Cal Roberts
Dorothy Lee as Barbara Hutton
Wilbur McGaugh as Steve Crosby
Grace Weed as Olive Green
Lafe McKee as Hard Coin Hoover
Clyde McClary as Webb Crowler
A. W. Dearie as Sheriff

References

American black-and-white films
Films directed by Victor Adamson